Maia Luisa Brewton (born September 30, 1977) is an American actress who enjoyed success in the late 1980s and early 1990s. She is best known for her roles as the Mighty Thor-obsessed Sara Anderson in the 1987 film Adventures in Babysitting, and as Shelly Lewis, the antagonistic sister of the title character on the Fox Network show Parker Lewis Can't Lose, from 1990 to 1993.

Acting career 
In 1985, she appeared in Back to the Future as Sally Baines, the younger sister of Marty McFly's mother Lorraine Baines. She then played Margaret Ann Culver in the short-lived 1985 television series Lime Street, starring Robert Wagner and Samantha Smith. After her role in Adventures in Babysitting, she played one of the children in the 1990 TV movie with Robert Mitchum which was the basis for the series A Family for Joe, and co-starred in the 1990 TV movie Sky Trackers with Pamela Sue Martin. This was followed by her run on Parker Lewis Can't Lose.

Her other television credits during the late 1980s include appearances on 21 Jump Street, Highway to Heaven, Trapper John, M.D. and The Wonder Years. She has also acted in various theatre productions, most notably at the City Garage Theatre in Santa Monica, California.

Personal life
Brewton was born in Los Angeles, California.

She graduated from Yale University (where she was a member of the Manuscript Society and Just Add Water) in 1998, and became an attorney.

Openly lesbian, she married Lara Spotts in 2008. The couple have twin boys, Rizzo and Calder.

Partial filmography
Back to the Future (1985) - Sally Baines
The Deliberate Stranger (1986) - Jenny Richter
Adventures in Babysitting (1987) - Sara Anderson

References

External links

1977 births
20th-century American actresses
Actresses from Los Angeles
American child actresses
American film actresses
American television actresses
American lesbian actresses
LGBT people from California
Living people
21st-century American women
Yale University alumni